Pycna semiclara, known as the Whining Forest Cicada,  is a South African forest-dwelling platypleurine cicada.

One of the largest cicadas in South Africa, this species reaches 40–50 mm in length. Its wings display green, brown and translucent patches, and are covered with silvery hairs. It is endemic to South Africa, and occurs in the Eastern Cape, KwaZulu-Natal, Mpumalanga and Limpopo provinces. It prefers indigenous forests, where undergrowth is sparse and trees are more than 4m tall, but may also be found in stands of Quercus robur, Populus deltoides, pine and eucalyptus.

It is also unusually found in dense riverine bushes in KwaZulu-Natal and Eastern Cape. Males usually call from a position a few meters above the ground on a shady limb of a tree, with a good view of the immediate surroundings and potential predators. Males often sing in chorus to attract mates, particularly at dusk and dawn, enabled to do this by an endothermic metabolism which rises to more than 22 °C above ambient temperature. This endothermy during crepuscular hours allows the use of optimal atmospheric conditions for acoustic communication and reduces chances of predation to a minimum. The species also produces an encounter call used in courtship and maintaining personal space within choruses, behaving aggressively to other males venturing closer than about 50 cm. Choruses may start up at any time of the day, but concentrate their calling in a half-hour period at dawn and dusk.

References

External links
iSpot gallery

Insects of Africa
Insects described in 1834
Platypleurini